Edith Maersk is a container ship and the sister ship of Emma Maersk. She has capacity for 13,500 containers; calculations from Maersk Line company say that it has only 11,000 TEUs capacity. She can reach up to 15,200 TEUs according to specialists.

Design 
The deadweight of the container ship is 156,907 metric tons, while the gross tonnage is 170,794 gross tons. The ship is powered by a 14-cylinder Wärtsilä RT-flex diesel engine with a power of 80,000 kW. Designers decided that this power is not enough for the ship and added a waste heat recovery system, which increased the power to 90,000 kW. The ship is registered in the port of Roskilde, Denmark in spite of higher taxes. The company is investing in home country taxes and prefers to use the home flags, despite lower restrictions of convenient flags' countries.

History

Edith Maersk was built by the Odense Steel Shipyard, Denmark and was handed over to the A.P. Moller – Maersk Group on Saturday 3 November 2007.

References 

Container ships
Merchant ships of Denmark
Ships of the Maersk Line
2007 ships
Ships built in Odense